Iashvili was a Georgian noble family known in Imereti (west Georgia) from the fifteenth century. In 1724, one of the members of this family followed the Georgian king Vakhtang VI of Kartli in his emigration to the Russian Empire, giving origin to a Russian branch known as Yashvil (Яшвиль). The Georgian line was received among the princely houses of the Russian Empire in 1850.

Notable members 
Lev Mikhailovich Yashvil (1772–1836), Russian general of artillery
Vladimir Mikhailovich Yashvil (1764–1815), Major General
Vladimir Vladimirovich Yashvil (1815–1864), Major General
Lev Vladimirovich Yashvil (1859–1917), Governor of Siberia.

References

See also 
 Iashvili

Noble families of Georgia (country)
Russian noble families

ru:Иашвили